Emmanuel Philippe Imorou (born 16 September 1988) is a former professional footballer who plays as a left-back. Born in France, he played for the Benin national team.

Club career
Imorou began his career in 2004 with Bourges, before joining the reserve team from Châteauroux in 2005. In 2007, he was promoted to the senior side. After two seasons of being rarely used, he was loaned out to the Championnat National club Gueugnon. At Gueugnon, he played non-league games and returned to Châteauroux for the 2010–11 season. For Imorou, that season was undoubtedly the most successful. Following this, he attracted much interest from clubs in France and abroad.

In the summer of 2011, he joined Primeira Liga team Braga on an undisclosed fee on a five-year contract. He was signed to fill in the gap in the full-back position left by Sílvio, who was sold to Atlético Madrid for €8 million. At Braga, his playing time was hampered by injuries, as well as a lack of playing time. He managed to play five games in the whole season and was mainly used as a backup in the full-back positions to Miguel Lopes and Uwa Elderson Echiéjilé. After a year with Braga, he left the club and signed for French side Clermont Foot of Ligue 2 in the summer of 2012 on a free transfer. On 24 June 2014, he joined the newly promoted Ligue 1 side Caen, ending a two-year career as a Clermont player.
On 22 September 2019, Imorou signed a contract with French club Thonon Evian.

International career
Imorou was born in France to Beninese parents, which grants him the right to play for the Benin national football team. He was called up the national side for the very first time 2010 to be a part of the squad which would play at the 2010 Africa Cup of Nations.

He was called up by Michel Dussuyer, who gave him his debut as a player against Mozambique during the group stage phase, where he came on as a substitute for Félicien Singbo. His nation finished third in their group behind eventual winners Egypt and Nigeria.

Since the Africa Cup of Nations, he has been called up on a regular basis to take part in qualification games and international friendlies.

He played at 2019 Africa Cup of Nations where the Beninreached the quarter-finals

Career statistics

International

Notes

References

External links
 
 

1988 births
Living people
Sportspeople from Bourges
Association football midfielders
French footballers
Citizens of Benin through descent
Beninese footballers
French sportspeople of Beninese descent
Benin international footballers
2010 Africa Cup of Nations players
2019 Africa Cup of Nations players
Beninese expatriate footballers
Expatriate footballers in France
Championnat National players
Ligue 1 players
Ligue 2 players
Primeira Liga players
Challenger Pro League players
LB Châteauroux players
FC Gueugnon players
S.C. Braga players
Clermont Foot players
Stade Malherbe Caen players
Cercle Brugge K.S.V. players
Thonon Evian Grand Genève F.C. players
Expatriate footballers in Portugal
Expatriate footballers in Belgium
French expatriate sportspeople in Portugal
French expatriate sportspeople in Belgium
Footballers from Centre-Val de Loire
Black French sportspeople